Regan Verney (born 19 November 1992) is a New Zealand rugby union player who plays for the  in the Super Rugby competition.  His position of choice is centre.

References 

New Zealand rugby union players
1992 births
Living people
Rugby union centres
Rugby union players from Taranaki